Lilian C. Garis , born Lilian C. McNamara (20 October 1873 – 19 April 1954) was an American author who wrote hundreds of books of juvenile fiction between around 1915 and the early 1940s. Prior to this, she was the first female reporter for the Newark Evening News in New Jersey. Garis and her husband, Howard R. Garis, were possibly the most prolific children's authors of the early 20th century.

Biography
Lilian McNamara was born in 1872 in Cleveland, Ohio. Her parents were Irish immigrants Edward and Winifred. Lillian wrote her own "Woman's Page" for a city paper as a teenager.  She attended private schools including Dunkirk Union School. In 1893 her poem "Peace" was featured in the New Jersey Scrapbook of Women Writers created for the World's Columbian Exposition. At this point she uses an alternate name "Lillian Mack" and lives in Newark.

Lilian was in charge of "Woman's Work" in the Newark Evening News from 1895 to 1900 and was known as "Miss Mack" or "Lilian Mack".  Lillian was also a suffragette.

Lilian met Howard Garis at the Newark Evening News and the  couple married in 1899. In 1951, they moved from East Orange, New Jersey to Amherst, Massachusetts. They had two children Roger and Cleo.

For the Stratemeyer Syndicate Garis wrote under the pseudonym Margaret Penrose and Laura Lee Hope, with her works including some of the earliest books in the Bobbsey Twins series as well as the Dorothy Dale series. But Mrs. Garis also wrote some books under her own name.

Lilian died April 19, 1954.

Bibliography of titles written under Garis' name

Let's Make Believe series
First published by R. F. Fenno; also by Donohue
 Let's Make Believe We're Keeping House
 Let's Play Circus
 Let's Make Believe We're Soldiers

The Girl Scouts series
 The Girl Scout Pioneers
 The Girl Scouts at Bellaire
 The Girl Scouts at Sea Crest
 The Girl Scouts at Camp Comalong
 The Girl Scouts at Rocky Ledge

Nancy Brandon set
Originally printed by Milton Bradley. Then by Grosset & Dunlap and Whitman
 Nancy Brandon, Enthusiast (Milton Bradley's original title; renamed Nancy Brandon by Grosset & Dunlap)
 Nancy Brandon's Mystery

Barbara Hale set
 Barbara Hale (renamed Barbara Hale: A Doctor's Daughter)
 Barbara Hale's Mystery Friend (renamed Barbara Hale: and Cozette)

Ted set
 A Girl Named Ted
 Ted and Tony

Cleo set
 Cleo's Conquest
 Cleo's Misty Rainbow

Connie Loring set
 Connie Loring's Dilemma (renamed later)
 Connie Loring's Ambition (renamed later)

Judy Jordon set
 Judy Jordon
 Judy Jordon's Discovery

Sally set
 Sally for Short
 Sally Found Out

Gloria set
 Gloria at Boarding School
 Gloria: A Girl and Her Dad

Joan set
 Joan: Just a Girl
 Joan's Garden of Adventure

Melody Lane series
Two versions were printed of the first six books, one with cover art by Ruth King and one by Pelagie Doane (best known for her work on the Judy Bolton series).  The series follows Carol Duncan and her sister and friends as they solve mysteries around Melody Lane. The events they encounter are standard series book fare of the time-period; and are often criticized for their dated writing style and slow-moving plots.
 The Ghost of Melody Lane (1933)
 The Forbidden Trail (1933)
 The Tower Secret (1934)
 The Wild Warning (1934)
 Terror at Moaning Cliff (1935)
 The Dragon Of The Hills (1936)
 The Mystery Of Stingman's Alley (1938)
 The Secret of the Kashmir Shawl (1939)
 The Hermit of Proud Hill (1940)
 The Clue of the Crooked Key Listed as the next title in the series in "The Hermit of Proud Hill". Never published and unknown if this book was ever written.

References

External links

Information on Girls Series
Stratemeyer's Other Garis Ghost: Lilian C. Garis Etexts
 
 
 
 

1873 births
1954 deaths
American women journalists
Writers from Newark, New Jersey